The LECOM Health Challenge was a golf tournament on the Korn Ferry Tour. It was first played in July 2016 on the Upper Course of Peek'n Peak Resort in Findley Lake, New York, which had previously hosted the Peek'n Peak Classic on the same tour from 2002 to 2007.

Winners

Bolded golfers graduated to the PGA Tour via the Korn Ferry Tour regular-season money list.

References

External links
Coverage on the Korn Ferry Tour's official site

Former Korn Ferry Tour events
Golf in New York (state)